Thomas Whitmore (12 February 1599 – May 1677) was an English lawyer and politician who sat in the House of Commons from 1659.

Whitmore was the eldest son of John Whitmore of Ludstone and his wife Frances Billingsley, daughter of William Billingsley of Astley, Shropshire. He was educated at New Inn Hall and at Wadham College, Oxford in 1617. He entered Middle Temple in  1620 and was called to the bar in 1626. He was sympathetic to the Royalist cause in the Civil War and in 1646 he was assessed at £300, later reduced to £60, by the committee for the advance of money. In 1648 he became a Bencher of Middle Temple. He was made freeman of Bridgnorth in 1655 and was recorder of the town from 1655 to 1676. He was a J.P. for Shropshire from 1656 until his death and was made freeman of Wenlock in 1658.

In 1659, Whitmore was elected Member of Parliament for Wenlock in the Third Protectorate Parliament. He was re-elected MP for Wenlock in  April 1660 for the Convention Parliament. On the Restoration, he was one of those proposed as Knight of the Royal Oak, with an annual income estimated at £600. He was recorder of Wenlock by April 1660, commissioner  for oyer and terminer for the Oxford circuit in July 1660 and commissioner for assessment for Shropshire from August 1660 until his death. In 1662 he was commissioner  for oyer and terminer for the Shropshire circuit and commissioner for corporations until 1663. He was commissioner for recusants in 1675. 
  

Whitmore married Anne Corbet, daughter of Thomas Corbet of Longnor, Shropshire.

References

1599 births
1677 deaths
Lawyers from Shropshire
Members of the Middle Temple
Alumni of Wadham College, Oxford
Cavaliers
English MPs 1659
English MPs 1660
Politicians from Shropshire
17th-century English lawyers